Kozlu  coal mine is located in Turkey's Zonguldak basin. the mine suffered a disaster (tr) in 1992, which killed 263 miners. The mine has an annual production capacity of 2 million tonnes of coal. Total organic carbon values are quite variable.

References

External links 

 Kozlu coal mine on Global Energy Monitor

Coal mining disasters in Turkey
Coal mines in Turkey
Zonguldak Province
1992 disasters in Turkey